Joel Everson (born 9 March 1990) is a New Zealand rugby union footballer who plays as a Lock for Southland in the ITM Cup. His domestic performances have seen him named in the   Wider Training Squad for the 2013 Super Rugby season.

References

External links 
Joel Everson itsrugby.co.uk Player Statistics

1990 births
New Zealand rugby union players
Canterbury rugby union players
Rugby union locks
Living people
Southland rugby union players
Rugby union players from Christchurch
People educated at Saint Kentigern College
Hino Red Dolphins players
ASM Clermont Auvergne players